Nidd Bridge railway station served the village of Nidd, North Yorkshire, England from 1848 to 1964 on the Leeds-Northallerton Railway.

History 
The station was opened as Ripley on 1 June 1848 by the Leeds Northern Railway. It was situated on the south side of the B6165. The goods yard was behind the down platform, which consisted of four sidings. One passed through the goods yard, one served a 5-ton crane and two docks, one  was alongside the line and the goods line and the other was behind the down platform. Its name was changed to Nidd Bridge on 1 June 1862, although it cost £411 for this change to happen. The main freight handled at the station was timber (155 tons). 105 wagons of livestock were also dispatched in 1911. The station was closed to passengers on 18 June 1962 and to goods traffic on 10 August 1964.

References

External links 

Former North Eastern Railway (UK) stations
Railway stations in Great Britain opened in 1848
Railway stations in Great Britain closed in 1962
1848 establishments in England
1964 disestablishments in England